Lithospermum ruderale is a species of flowering plant in the borage family known by the common name western stoneseed or lemonweed. It is native to western Canada and the western United States, where it can be found in many types of habitat. A perennial herb growing from a taproot and woody caudex, it is covered with fine, more or less upright, hairs, especially on the stems. It produces a cluster of erect leafy stems ranging from  centimeters in height. Bunches of flowers with leaf-like bracts appear toward the top of the stem amongst the leaves. The corolla is fused at the base with five lobes which are light yellow, often slightly greenish, and about a centimeter long and wide. The style is short. The fruit consists of one or two, sometimes four, clustered glossy grey nutlets, 3.5 to 6, sometimes as much as 8 mm long.

The plant was used as a contraceptive by several Native American groups, including the Navajo and Shoshone. Studies on mice show the plant reduced their fertility. Plains Indians also used the roots to treat respiratory issues and cooked them as food.

References

External links

Jepson Manual Treatment
Photo gallery

ruderale
Plants used in traditional Native American medicine
Flora of North America